Sir Stuart Edmond Pearks (1875–1931) served as the Chief Commissioner of the North-West Frontier Province of British India from 1930 until 1931.

References 

1875 births
1931 deaths
People from British India
British people in colonial India